Santiago Mitre (born 4 December 1980) is an Argentine film director and screenwriter. He was named as a member of the jury of the International Critics' Week section of the 2016 Cannes Film Festival. In 2016, Mitre won the Havana Star Prize for Best Director for his film Paulina at the 17th Havana Film Festival New York.

Selected filmography
 El Amor – primera parte (2004)
 The Student (2011)
 White Elephant (2012)
 La patota (2015, known as Paulina in Spain)
 The Summit (2017)
 Argentina, 1985 (2022)

References

External links

1980 births
Living people
Argentine film directors
Argentine screenwriters
People from Buenos Aires